The Greek Minor Prophets Scroll from Nahal Hever (8HevXII gr) is a Greek manuscript of a revision of the Septuagint dated to the 1st century CE. The manuscript is kept in the Rockefeller Museum in Jerusalem. It was first published by Dominique Barthélemy in 1963. The Rahlfs-Siglum is 943.

Discovery and history
In the 1st century CE, the 8HevXII gr with several documents was taken by Jewish fugitives (Bar Kokhba's troops, women and children) who were taking refuge in the Caves of Nahal Hever. After accepting their death, unable to leave because of the presence of Roman camps outside the caves, who besieged the inmates as a military camp located above the cave shows, the refugees decided to make a large bonfire and burn all their belongings, but buried the Greek Minor Prophets Scroll and other important documents between the rocks of the end chamber. Inside the caves, a burnt layer was found which suggests that the last inhabitants of the cave had burned all their possessions. The scroll had been buried, and other documents that would have provided information about other insurgents that wanted to destroy them so as not to let them fall into the hands of the Romans. This practice is mainly known from the later Jewish tradition (Geniza), but was also observed in this twelve-prophet scroll apparently from Wadi Murabba'at. 

Between 1946 and 1947 the Dead Sea Scrolls were discovered by Bedouins. Since 1948, Nahal Hever has been part of Israel, but the Bedouins reported that the manuscripts came from Wadi Seiyal to legitimize their possession. Due to the excavations of the Bedouins, the archaeological context could no longer be determined. The Bedouins sold their finds to researchers in East Jerusalem, which was under Jordanian control at the time, while Wadi Seiyal was in Israel.

From 1952 to 1954 the manuscripts that comprised what was known as the Seiyâl collection was acquired by the Palestine Archaeological Museum (today is Rockefeller Museum), from clandestine excavators. Among the fragments were also parts of a scroll of the Twelve Prophets book, and were catalogued as Se2grXII (Seiyâl Collection No. 2).

In 1953, scarcely a year after the Bedouin had brought these materials to the École biblique et archéologique française in Jordanian Jerusalem, Dominique Barthélemy published a "brief analysis of the fragments" in French of the Greek Minor Prophets scroll from the then "unknown provenance" somewhere south of Wadi Murabba'at.

Amongst other things, in response to rumors that parts of the sold scrolls came from Israel, Hebrew University of Jerusalem sent two expeditions, in 1960 and 1961, for exploration through the Wadi to the west of the Dead Sea. In the expedition B of the company in spring 1961 under the direction of Yohanan Aharoni, who examined mainly the caves on the southern edge of Nahal Hever, in Cave no. 8 (the Cave of Horror) it found, among other things, fragments of the Greek scroll. Most of which only a few centimeters between large fragments could still be associated with the twelve minor prophets. It also became apparent relatively quickly that the fragments were parts of the same scroll that had been purchased ten years earlier. The locality of this role - as well as most of the other scrolls of the Seiyâl Collection - was therefore contrary to the specification of the Bedouin of the Nachal Hever determined before

The other fragments found in expedition B of the Hebrew University of Jerusalem in cave No. 8 in Nahal Hever (Judean Desert) named Cave of Horror, were examined by Baruch Lifshitz. Lifshitz published the Se2grXII fragments together with the other new fragments found in the Cave of Horror. In 1961 and 1962, Lifshitz published the fragments with photographs in Yediot and in Israel Exploration Journal which Emanuel Tov called "the first edition, still substandar". Tov wrote that "these small fragments were published by B. Lifshitz, "The Greek Documents from th Cave of Horror," IEJ 12 (1962) 201-7 as well as in a Hebrew Version." Lifshitz thinks that there are two apart manuscripts of the Greek Minor Prophets Scroll because repeated biblical verses appear in his textual identifications.

In 1963 Dominique Barthélemy publishes his preliminary study in French, and describes in detail the facts of the discovering of the scroll. Here he publishes the main text, but there are still some unidentified fragments.

Already in 1990 Emanuel Tov published the textual edition of the Greek Minor Prophets Scroll from Nahal Hever. Throughout studies of the fragments, and in reference works, acronyms such as Se2grXII, LXXIEJ12, LXXVTS10a, Rahlfs 493a, 8HevXIIa, LXXVTS10b, Rahlfs 493b, 8HevXIIa, Rahlfs 493 and 8HevXII have been used, so in 1990, Emanuel Tov, Robert A. Kraft and Peter J. Parsons recommend that scholars use the acronym 8HevXIIgr, becoming the modern sigla. Tov, as well as George Howard, agree that if Lifshitz's identifications are correct, then there are two manuscripts of the Minor Prophets.

New discovery 2021
New fragments have been found in 2021 and are being studied for the textual reconstruction of the manuscript.

Description

Version 
Since its discovery, the editors agree that this is an early revision of the Septuagint in alignment with the Hebrew text. Dominique Barthélemy established that text found "is neither a new translation nor an independent one, but rather a recension of the Septuagint text". According to Tuukka Kauhanen, a Postdoctoral Researcher at the Faculty of Theology at University of Helsinki, this manuscript is an early Hebraizing revision (i.e. in B-text of books such as Joshua, Judges, and Samuel-Kings), Eugene C. Ulrich wrote "attests the recension commonly referred to as Proto-Theodotion or καιγε" recension, which is reaffirmed by Pavlos D. Vasileiadis, a Doctor of Theology at the Aristotle University of Thessaloniki. James A.E. Mulroney quoting Emanuel Tov, Robert A. Kraft and Peter J. Parsons claim that "although 8HevXIIgr was a revision of OG towards the proto-MT, it retained significant continuity with the OG text… was a revision, not a new translation". David L. Washburn wrote that is a direct translation from an MT-type manuscript into Greek, i.e. not part of the Septuagint tradition.

Dimensions and content 

The roll is one of the partially preserved, basically better in the lower part. Only column 8 contains parts of all four edges, from most other columns usually only the lower one as well, parts of the right or left edge. Reconstruction attempts show that the average number of lines per column is about 42. In contrast, in the back part, which can be assigned to another hand, the letters are written larger, and therefore the columns contain only 33 lines. The columns therefore had a height of about 27 cm. The column width, however, varies between 7.5 and 9 cm or 29 and 43 letters, in the back even only 22-24 letters. This is apparently related to the width of the individual leather sheets sewn together into a roll. While the sheets themselves were different in width, the columns appear to have been drawn relatively evenly on a sheet. The height of the roll can finally be determined with about 35 cm. Calculations on the number of columns depend very much on what content the role had. Assuming an originally complete twelve-prophecy book, the role should have included between 80 and 94 columns, which would correspond to about 9.6 – 10 m. The role would be longer than any surviving scrolls from Qumran. However, only parts of the books Jonah, Micah, Nahum, Habakkuk, Zephaniah and Zechariah are identified.

Text and scribe 
As differences in letter form and size show, the manuscript was written by two different scribes. On the other hand, the assumption that instead the fragments should be divided into two different roles is less likely. The cause of the various clerk hands, however, is unclear. Either the role was first started by a writer and later ended by a second, or else the leather sheets with the second manuscript were inserted for repair. Several lines have been left between the individual books, but possible book titles are not attested. The continuous text is divided into larger and smaller sections, and it is even possible to observe a division into verses. The division into units of meaning agrees largely with the division of the Masoretic text in Setumot and Petuchot. To mark such sections, either draw a horizontal line between the lines - an paragraph - or the new line starts slightly to the left and with a slightly larger initial letter. Between individual words of a verse, however, at first hand there is usually no gap left.

Tetragrammaton 

This manuscript shows the use of the tetragrammaton in the 1st century. Papyrus Oxyrhynchus 1007 is in fact difficult to identify as either Christian or Jewish, as on the barely legible recto side (in Gen 2:18) it contains the nomen sacrum  (characteristic of Christian manuscripts) and the Tetragrammaton represented as a double yodh יי (characteristic of Jewish manuscripts). According to Edmon L. Gallagher, a faculty member of Heritage Christian University, "extant Greek manuscripts from Qumran and elsewhere that are unambiguously Jewish (because of the date) also include several ways of representing the Divine Name, none of which was with κύριος, the term used everywhere in our Christian manuscripts". Jewish manuscripts, such as those found in Qumran, did not render it into Greek, but instead reproduced it within the Greek text in several different ways. Some gave it in either Hebrew, Aramaic or paleo-Hebrew letters. Others transliterated it in Greek characters as ΠΙΠΙ or ΙΑΩ.

In this manuscript the tetragrammaton in Old Hebrew script appears in Jon 3:3; Jon 4:2; Mic 1:1, 3; Mic 4:4, 5, 7; Mic 5:4, 4; Hab 2:14, 16, 20; Hab 3:9; Zep 1:3, 14; Zep 2:10; Zec 1:3, 3, 4; Zec 3:5, 6, 7; Zec 8:20; 9:1, 1, 4. The scribe himself seems to have inserted the paleo-Hebrew characters directly, probably from left to right, contrary to the normal direction for Hebrew, when writing the Greek text. George Howard states, in Journal of Biblical Literature (1977):

It has the tetragrammaton everywhere in the phrase ἄγγελος יהוה (Angel of YHWH) instead of ἄγγελος Κυρίου (Angel of the Lord) in Zech 3:1-2, 5 and 6. The oldest example of ἄγγελος Κυρίου is in P. Oxy. 1166 from 3rd century, more than two centuries after LXXVTS10a. 

In March 2021, archaeologists announced the discovery of a Dead Sea Scroll, this time written in Hebrew, that also wrote the Tetragrammaton in the paleo-Hebrew script.

See also 
 Kaige revision

References

Bibliography 
 Dominique Barthélemy: Les devanciers d’Aquila. Supplements to Vetus Testamentum 10. Leiden 1963.

External links 
 Full text from the fragment of the scroll 8HevXII gr (pdf file)
 Images of the Scroll scanned

1st-century biblical manuscripts
1952 archaeological discoveries
1961 archaeological discoveries
Archaeological discoveries in Israel
Dead Sea Scrolls
Septuagint manuscripts